SoftRAM and SoftRAM95 were system software products which claimed to double the available random-access memory in Microsoft Windows without the need for a hardware upgrade.  However, it later emerged that the program did not even attempt to increase available memory.  In July 1996, the developer of SoftRAM, Syncronys settled charges brought by the Federal Trade Commission of "false and misleading" claims in relation to the capability of the software. The product was rated the third "Worst Tech Product of All Time" by PC World in 2006. Around 100,000 to 600,000 copies of the software were sold overall.

As SoftRAM and SoftRAM95 were faulty, the company had to file for bankruptcy because they could not afford $10 rebates for affected consumers. The main owners of the company were Rainer Poertner (20.9%), Wendell Brown (13.5%) and a British Virgin Islands company called Mobius Capital Corp. which owned 55.3%. The proxy statement document also names a certain Daniel G. Taylor as the only person with indirect beneficial interest in Mobius Capital Corp, who received his law degree from Osgoode Hall in 1982.

SoftRAM
SoftRAM was designed for use with Windows 3.1. It was launched in March 1995 and sold more than 100,000 copies.

Most out-of-memory errors in Windows 3.x were caused by the first megabyte of memory in a computer, the conventional memory, becoming full. Windows needed to allocate a Program Segment Prefix (PSP) in this area of memory for each program started. Some utilities prevented DLLs from allocating memory here, leaving more space for user programs. This was a standard technique also used by other memory optimization tools. SoftRAM also claimed to increase the amount of virtual memory available by compressing the pages of virtual memory stored in the swap file on the hard disk, which has the added effect of reducing the number of swap file reads and writes. The software also increased the size of the Windows page file, something easily achievable for free and without the use of additional software by changing system settings.

SoftRAM95
SoftRAM95 was designed for Windows 95 and was released in August 1995.  The company sold over 600,000 copies of SoftRAM95 at a list price of USD $79.95, GBP £60 or 170 DM.

When Windows 95 was launched, it was widely reported that software for the operating system would be "memory hungry", requiring at least 4 megabytes of memory and preferably 8. Syncronys positioned SoftRAM as a cheaper alternative to buying more memory for those who would otherwise be unable to run Windows 95.

FTC investigation
In December 1995, the German computing journal c't disassembled the program and determined that it did not even attempt to do what was claimed. In fact, the data passed through the VxD completely unaltered so that no compression whatsoever could have taken place. The actual drivers were in fact slightly modified versions of code examples taken from Microsoft's "Windows Development Kit". Still, the program would try to pretend that it increased system resources, by silently increasing the size of the swap file on Windows 3.1 and by giving false information on the current state of the system. Even worse, the program was compiled with the debug flag on and so ran slower than the original driver from Microsoft. A further test by PC Magazine revealed that SoftRAM took the same amount of time to move through systems that contained varying amounts of RAM; leading the magazine's technical editor to call SoftRAM completely "devoid of value".  Another study by Dr. Dobb's Journal came to the same conclusions.

The Federal Trade Commission began an investigation in late 1995, ultimately concluding that Syncronys' claims about SoftRAM were "false and misleading".  They also concluded that "SoftRAM95 does not increase RAM in a computer using Windows 95; nor does the product enhance the speed, capacity, or other performance measures of a computer using Windows 95". The investigation prompted the company to recall both SoftRAM and SoftRAM95 from the market in December 1995.  Several individual customers filed suit against the company as well.  Syncronys settled with the FTC and the suing customers in 1996.  As part of the FTC settlement, it agreed to give US$10 rebates to any customers who requested them. Around that time, the software was called "placebo software", a program based on the placebo effect.

Bankruptcy

Syncronys filed for bankruptcy in July 1998 with $4.5 million of debt after releasing a dozen other poorly received tools. Their final release, UpgradeAID 98, claimed to allow users to downgrade from Windows 98 to Windows 95, duplicating an existing feature of Windows 98 for $39.95 (equivalent to $ in  dollars). A large number of its creditors were customers who had not received their rebates for SoftRAM.

Syncronys replaced its board and leadership and operated under Chapter 7 bankruptcy until 2002. In 2006, the SEC revoked its securities and placed Syncronys in default for failing to file any financial reports since their 1998 Chapter 11 bankruptcy event.

References

External links
 
 

Utilities for Windows
Computer system optimization software
1995 software
False advertising